Leslie A. Molloy (December 8, 1907 – July 31, 1982) was an American football player. He played college football at Loyola of Chicago and professional football in the National Football League (NFL) as a back for the Chicago Cardinals from 1931 to 1933. He appeared in 26 NFL games, 13 as a starter.

References

1907 births
1982 deaths
Loyola Ramblers football players
Chicago Cardinals players
Players of American football from Minnesota